The Massabki Brothers, Abdel Moati Massabki, Francis Massabki and Raphael Massabki are three Maronite saints from Damascus. The three brothers were sons of Nehme Massabki.

The brothers were killed because of their religion while praying inside a Franciscan church in Damascus. Pope Pius XI proclaimed the beatification of the three brothers in 1926. On the 18th of December 2022, the Maronite patriarch Bechara Boutros al-Rahi announced that the Massabki Brothers would be recognized as saints without the need for a miracle because they were martyrs of the faith.

Sources 

19th-century Christian saints
Lebanese beatified people
Christian saints killed by Muslims